Natalie Hennedige (born 1974) is the Artistic Director of Cake Theatrical Productions, a contemporary performance company based in Singapore. She is a recipient of the National Arts Council Young Artist Award in 2007 and the JCCI Singapore Foundation Culture Award in 2010. Natalie conceptualises, writes and directs works in theatre and other media. She also constantly collaborates with artists from across disciplines such as visual arts, film and video, performance art and dance. Natalie engineers contemporary works that are artistically adventurous and that defy classification, playing at conventional performance venues, unusual spaces of creative experimentation and in public spaces to create performance-based experiences.

Early life
Hennedige was born 1974 in Singapore, to an upper-class family. Her father is a Tanjong Katong-based dentist of Sinhalese ancestry and her mother, Irene, is a former businesswoman who ran a dental goods business. Hennedige has four younger sisters, three of which are doctors and one of which is a New York-based lawyer. As a child, Hennedige resided in Mountbatten with her family.

She studied at Victoria Junior College.

Career
Hennedige made her first play, A Matter of Potency, while at junior college. After her stints at TheatreWorks and The Necessary Stage, two theatre companies where she directed and starred in many plays, Hennedige established her own performance company, Cake Theatrical Productions, usually shortened to just Cake, in 2005. In 2007, Hennedige was awarded the National Arts Councils' Young Artist Award. Hennedige "poured her savings into Cake" and up till 2011, the company's headquarters were situated at her father's dental clinic. 

With Cake, she has written and directed over 35 works for theatre and film. These works are highly theatrical and pop with elaborate set, props, costume and multimedia. She is known for her unique contemporary style. 

In recent years, Natalie Hennedige has been re-imagining the classics with works like Ophelia (2016),  Electra (2017),  Medea (2018),  and most recently Rubber Girl on the loose (2019), based on Sophocles' Antigone, 
, giving voice to the transgressive women of history.

Natalie Hennedige is also the Artistic Director of Running with Strippers. Its initial inception began in 2011 as Decimal Points,  a space for artists from a range of disciplines to make performances from the vantage point of their unique artistic perspective. This was Cake's commitment to experimentation, to show alternative. In 2015, Cake stripped their former studio bare to host the first iteration of Running with Strippers. Since then, Strippers has grown to embody the germination of ideas in arid spaces. They saw a necessity to wrestle out of the ennui that threatens to cloud the creative space, that pushes risk, experimentation, defiance and stubbornness out of the picture, giving way to lethargy, fear and ease. Strippers has grown to become a resistance against institution, coercion, the status quo - ambling along like a nomad, occupying odd non-spaces; un-defined insignificant vacant spaces, and moving on. The more momentum it garnered, the more Strippers defined for itself what it wanted, the proliferation of the fiercely alternative in the arts.

Plays
 Animal Vegetable Mineral (2005) – playwright and director
 Queen Ping (2006) – playwright and director
 CHEEK (2006) – playwright and director
 Divine Soap (2006) – director
 Nothing (2007) – playwright and director
 y grec (2007) – director
 Temple (2008) – playwright and director
 Flare (2008) – director
 Destinies of Flowers In the Mirror (2009) – director
 The Comedy of the Tragic Goats (2009) – playwright
 Cuckoo Birds (2009, 2010) – director
 Invisibility/Breathing (2010) – director
 Utter "Thirteen Ways of Looking and Other Observations" (2011) – director and curator
 Decimal Points 0.01 (2011) – playwright
 Decimal Points 7.7 (2012) – playwright
 Illogic (2013) – playwright and director
 Raj and The End of Tragedy (2014) - director
 Running with Strippers (2015) - artistic director
 Versus (2015) - director
 Ophelia (2016) - playwright and director
 Being Haresh Sharma (2017) – director
 Electra (2017) - playwright and director
 Running with Strippers: Thou Shall Not (2017) - artistic director
 Medea (2017, 2018) - playwright and director
 A Litany of Broken Prayer and Promise (2017, 2018) – playwright and director
 Temple (2018) - playwright and director
 Running with Strippers: On the Rocks (2018) - artistic director
 Rubber Girl on the loose (2019) - playwright and director
 Running with Strippers: Rave (2019) - artistic director

Telemovie
 Desire (2014) – playwright and director

Awards
2015  12th Annual BOH Cameronian Arts Awards: “Best Director” (Raj & The End of Tragedy) 

2014  Cultural Fellowship | National Arts Council 

2010  JCCI Singapore Foundation Culture Award 

2010  8th Annual BOH Cameronian Arts Awards: “Best Director” (Cuckoo Birds) 

2009  Life! Theatre Awards: ‘Best Costume Design’ (Temple) 

2008  Life! Theatre Awards: ‘Production of the Year’ (Nothing) 

2008  Life! Theatre Awards: ‘Best Director’ (Nothing) 

2007  National Arts Council Young Artist Award (Theatre) 

2007  Life! Theatre Awards: ‘Best Sound Design’ (Queen Ping) 

2007  Life! Theatre Awards: ‘Best Costume Design’ (Queen Ping)

References

1974 births
Singaporean dramatists and playwrights
Singaporean theatre directors
Singaporean people of Sri Lankan descent
Singaporean people of Indian descent
Living people